Joanna Mary Manning is a New Zealand academic, and a full professor in the Faculty of Law at the University of Auckland.

Academic career

After an undergraduate at University of Auckland, Manning did a Masters at George Washington University and worked as a prosecutor before returning to academia at Auckland, rising to full professor.

Manning has held a number of roles relating to medical ethics, including with the Medical Practitioners Disciplinary Committee, National Ethics Advisory Committee and Scientific Advisory Committee of the Heart Foundation NZ. She has also edited a source book on one of New Zealand's biggest medical ethics controversies, the Cartwright Inquiry.

Selected works 
 Manning, Joanna, ed. The Cartwright Papers: Essays on the Cervical Cancer Inquiry, 1987–88. Bridget Williams Books, 2009.

References

External links
 

Living people
New Zealand women academics
Year of birth missing (living people)
Academic staff of the University of Auckland
University of Auckland alumni
George Washington University Law School alumni
21st-century New Zealand lawyers
Medical ethicists